B. J. Puttaswamy is an Indian politician who served as the Minister of Cooperation Government of Karnataka under Jagadish Shettar. He was later sacked from the cabinet for having attended B. S. Yediyurappa led Karnataka Janata Paksha rally at Haveri.

References 

1939 births
Living people
People from Mandya district
Bharatiya Janata Party politicians from Karnataka